Clifton is a historic home located at Ednor, Montgomery County, Maryland, United States. It is a -story gambrel-roofed brick structure with a lower north wing, also with a gambrel roof.  Outbuildings on the property include a wood-frame shed and a guest house or cottage. It is one of the few extant mid-18th-century buildings in Montgomery County and is associated with the local Quaker community, which by 1753 had been organized into the Sandy Spring Meeting of Friends.

Clifton was listed on the National Register of Historic Places in 1974.

References

External links

, including photo in 1973, at the Maryland Historical Trust website

Clifton at The Society of Architectural Historians (SAH)'s SAH Archipedia

Houses on the National Register of Historic Places in Maryland
Houses completed in 1760
Houses in Montgomery County, Maryland
Historic American Buildings Survey in Maryland
National Register of Historic Places in Montgomery County, Maryland